The 1895 Army Cadets football team represented the United States Military Academy in the 1895 college football season. In their second and final season under head coach Harmon S. Graves, the Cadets compiled a 5–2 record, shut out five of their seven opponents, and outscored all opponents by a combined total of 141 to 32.  The Army–Navy Game was not played in 1895. On November 2, 1895, Army lost to Yale by a 28 to 8 score in what one press account called the greatest and most exciting game of football ever played on the West Point grounds."

No Army Cadets were honored on the 1895 College Football All-America Team.

Schedule

References

Army
Army Black Knights football seasons
Army Cadets football